In ballet, a soloist is a dancer in a ballet company above the corps de ballet but below principal dancer.

Dancers at this level perform the majority of the solo and minor roles in a ballet, such as Mercutio in Romeo and Juliet or one of the Fairies in The Sleeping Beauty.

See also 
 Demi-soloist

References 

Ballet occupations